Anabelle Acosta is a Cuban-born American actress. She played Annabella in the HBO television series Ballers and Natalie Vasquez in the ABC television series Quantico.

Career 

In 2015, Acosta played the recurring role of Annabella in the HBO's comedy series Ballers, she played the role of the girlfriend of Ricky Jerret, played by John David Washington.

Acosta starred as FBI recruit Natalie Vasquez in ABC's thriller series Quantico.

Personal life

In 2018, Acosta began dating former Criminal Minds actor and current S.W.A.T. actor Shemar Moore.

Later on in 2018, Acosta rekindled a past relationship with a Dominican actor, Algenis Perez Soto. They married on April 24, 2019.

Filmography

Film

Television

References

External links 
 
 

Living people
1987 births
Actresses from Havana
Cuban emigrants to the United States
Cuban film actresses
Cuban television actresses
21st-century Cuban actresses
American film actresses
American television actresses
21st-century American actresses
Hispanic and Latino American actresses